Kini'je is a Yukaghir deity responsible for the flow of time.

Siberian deities
Yukaghir people